Los Strwck (pronounced "strook") is a Mexican musical group, founded in 1966. Led by Elbert Moguel, they originated from Guadalajara, Jalisco Their biggest hits include the ballads "Él", "Dilo tú", "Quién" and "Recuerdo estudiantil". They mainly made rock and roll, ballad, and cumbia music.

The group was initially called "Fuego" ("Fire") and later "Los Extraños" ("The Strangers"), but they often met with difficulties because there were already other groups with those names. Because of this, Moguel came up with the notorious "Strwck" name after deciding that he wanted to create a name that had no vowel letters, and therefore a word that wouldn't exist in any language and that wasn't already the name of any other group. Their first album, "La Doctoriza", blends rock & roll music, cumbia, psychedelic rock and ballads. However, their later releases were more conventional ballads and cumbia songs.

The group was very popular in Mexico in the 1970s, and many of Moguel's compositions were hits as recorded by other groups.

Members
Elbert Moguel - lead vocals, guitar, composer
Domingo Lomeli - bass guitar, drums
Carlos Robles "El Fender" - guitar
Miguel Flores - Keyboard
Adalberto - drums
Gustavo - keyboard
Indalecio Anaya - Guitar, vocals

Discography

La Doctoriza (LP) (1969)
 La Doctoriza 	
 Llora Tu Corazȯn 	
 Dulce Pequeňa 	
 Comunicame Tu Ritmo 	
 Mater Nostra 	
 W-A-Loo 	
 Rompiendo Corazones 	
 Dijiste No 	
 Primera Vez 	
 Nena Ven

La Suegra (LP) (1970)
La Suegra
Vanidosa
El Ausente
Pobre Reyna
Canción
Go-Go 70
Ni en Defensa Propia
Un Sueño
Parras
Él

Presentando Los Strwck (LP) (1974) (MM 5064)
 Él
 Cuidado Marinero
 Los Doctoriza
 Llora tu Corazon
 La Fiebre Amarilla 	
 Pobre Reyna 	
 La Suegra 	
 Cancion 	
 Rompiendo Corazones 	
 A La Luna 	
 Dulce Pequeňa 	
 Un Sueňo

Pintura Magica (Album) (1975) (MEL 100)
 Dilo Tu 	
 Cuanto Se Sufre 	
 Linda Chiquilla 	
 Pintura Magica 	
 Yo Fui 	
 Hoy Te Vas 	
 Morenita 	
 Alcobas Separadas 	
 No Es Bonita 	
 Mi Mañana

Singles
  Rompiendo Corazones (1966)
  La Doctoriza (1969)
  Comunicame tu Ritmo (1969)
  Un Sueño (1970): composed by Moguel, it was later covered by La Tropa Loca, whose version was a number-one hit on the Mexican charts in 1973 for three weeks, and was also the most successful record of the year in that country. 
  Go go 70 (1970)
  Pobre Reyna (1970)
  Él (1970): song composed by Elbert Moguel, number one hit in Mexico for 4 weeks alongside a cover by sonorense Grupo Yndio.
  La Suegra (1970)
  Canción (1970)
  El Ausente (1970)
  Ni en Defensa Propia (1970)
  Parras (1970)
  Vanidosa (1970)
  Cumbia Selene (1971)
  Adiós Amigo (1974)
  Dilo Tú (1974)
  Linda Chiquilla (1974)
  Jaliscumbia (1978)
  Quién (1979): one of their other best known songs
  Recuerdo Estudiantil (1979)
  Ingenua
  Los Ausentes

See also
 List of number-one hits of 1973 (Mexico)
 Yndio
 Los Freddy's
 Los Yonic's

References

Mexican musical groups
Musical groups established in 1966
1966 establishments in Mexico